Plagues and Peoples is a book on epidemiological history by historian William H. McNeill published  by Anchor Books in 1976. It was a critical and popular success, offering a radical new interpretation of the extraordinary impact of infectious disease on cultures as a means of enemy attack. The book ranges from examining the effects of smallpox in Mexico, the bubonic plague in China, to the typhoid epidemic in Europe.

With the onset of the AIDS epidemic in the early 1980s, a new preface was added to the book.

References

Further reading  
 Diamond, Jared (1997) Guns, Germs and Steel New York: W. W. Norton.

External links
 Book at archive.org
 Book review by Aaron Whelchel at World History Connected
 Book Review by Kirkus
 Book Review by Ryan Young at Competitive Enterprise Institute

1976 non-fiction books
Books about diseases
American history books
Doubleday (publisher) books